Ahmed Shaaban, (born 10 October 1978) is a retired Egyptian footballer. He played as a defensive midfielder for the Egyptian club Petrojet SC as well as Egypt national football team.

He was a member of Egypt's squad in Ghana 2008 African Cup of Nations. He also appeared in one qualifying match for the 2010 FIFA World Cup.

References

External links

1978 births
Living people
Egyptian footballers
Egypt international footballers
2008 Africa Cup of Nations players
Association football midfielders
Petrojet SC players
El Entag El Harby SC players
Egyptian Premier League players